Rudolf Buchbinder (born 1 December 1946, Litoměřice, Czechoslovakia) is an Austrian classical pianist.

Biography
Buchbinder studied with Bruno Seidlhofer at the Vienna Academy of Music. In 1965, he made a tour of North and South Americas. In 1966 he won a special prize awarded at the Van Cliburn International Piano Competition.  Subsequently he has toured with the Vienna Philharmonic and appeared as soloist around the world.

He has also taught piano at the Basel Academy of Music.

For the Teldec label he has recorded the complete keyboard music of Joseph Haydn, all Mozart's major works for piano, all the Beethoven piano sonatas and variations, and both Brahms piano concertos with Harnoncourt and the Royal Concertgebouw Orchestra of Amsterdam. With János Starker, he recorded memorable performances of works for cello and piano by Beethoven and Brahms. He has twice recorded the Beethoven Piano Concertos conducting from the keyboard, first with the Vienna Symphony Orchestra for the Preiser label in 2007, and then with the Vienna Philharmonic for the Sony label in 2011; this cycle was recorded live in concert and released on both CD and DVD.

He is one of the few pianists to have ever recorded the entire Part II of Vaterländischer Künstlerverein, which consists of 50 variations by 50 different composers on a waltz by Anton Diabelli. He has also recorded Beethoven's Diabelli Variations, which originally comprised Part I of that anthology. He is a life-long interpreter of Mozart's piano concertos and sonatas, displaying a mastery and sensitivity of these great works, conducting usually from the keyboard. Indeed Mozart's music is at the heart of his repertoire.

Since 2007, Buchbinder has been the artistic director of the Grafenegg Festival.

In 2009, Buchbinder was featured in the award-winning German-Austrian documentary Pianomania, about a Steinway & Sons piano tuner, which was directed by Lilian Franck and Robert Cibis. The film premiered theatrically in North America, where it was met with positive reviews by The New York Times, as well as in Asia and throughout Europe, and is a part of the Goethe-Institut catalogue.

Decorations and awards
 1961: First Prize at the International Competition in Munich, division "Piano Trio"
 1962: Lipatti Medal
 1966: Special prize awarded at the Van Cliburn International Piano Competition
 1970: Mozart Interpretation Prize of the Austrian Minister for Education and the Arts
 1977: Grand Prix du Disque for the entire piano works of Joseph Haydn
 1989: Austrian Cross of Honour for Science and Art
 1992: Honorary Member of the Vienna Symphony
 1994: Honorary Member of the Carinthian Summer
 1995: Austrian Cross of Honour for Science and Art, 1st class
 1996: Great Merit of the Province of Salzburg
 1996: Grand Gold Decoration of Carinthia
 1996:  of the Vienna Symphony
 1996: Gold Medal for services to the City of Vienna
 1999: Grand Gold Decoration of Lower Austria
 2003: Grand Gold Decoration for Services to the Republic of Austria
 2004: Gold Medal of Salzburg
 2007: Gold Medal of the Austrian capital Vienna
 2008: Honorary Member of the Society of Friends of Music in Vienna
 2010: Tourism Award of the State of Lower Austria for his work in music tourism in Grafenegg
 2011: Gloria Artis, Medal for Merit to Culture 
 2012: Echo Klassik in German music award as Instrumentalist of the Year (piano) and the album Beethoven: The Sonata Legacy issued by RCA Red Seal/Sony
 2016: Honorary member of the Vienna Philharmonic
 2017: Vienna Mozart Prize

References

Sources

External links
 Biography from IMG Artists
 Hear Rudolf Buchbinder in concert  from WGBH Radio Boston
 Piano Genealogy on Pianists Corner
 Piano Playlist on Pianists Corner

1946 births
University of Music and Performing Arts Vienna alumni
Living people
People from Litoměřice
Austrian classical pianists
Male classical pianists
German Bohemian people
Deutsche Grammophon artists
Austrian people of German Bohemian descent
Recipients of the Austrian Cross of Honour for Science and Art, 1st class
Recipients of the Grand Decoration for Services to the Republic of Austria
Recipients of the Gold Medal for Merit to Culture – Gloria Artis
Members of the Society of Friends of Music in Vienna
21st-century classical pianists
21st-century male musicians